Time Warner Cable Spectrum may refer to

 Time Warner Cable, an American cable communications company acquired by Charter Communications
 Spectrum (brand), a trade name of Charter Communications